Eucalyptus percostata, commonly known as the rib-capped mallee or Devils peak mallee, is a species of mallee that is endemic to South Australia. It has smooth bark, lance-shaped adult leaves, flower buds in groups of seven, creamy white flowers and cup-shaped to conical fruit. It is only known from a few locations in the Flinders Ranges.

Description
It has smooth whitish bark that is coppery when new. Flowering from May to September and the flowers are creamy white.

Taxonomy
Eucalyptus percostata was first formally described in 1990 by Ian Brooker and Peter Lang in Journal of the Adelaide Botanic Gardens from material collected on a track east of Devils Peak, near Quorn in 1986. The specific epithet (percostata) is from Latin meaning "conspicuously ribbed", referring to the operculum.

Distribution and habitat
Rib-capped mallee grows in woodland and mallee in the southern Flinders Ranges between Quorn and Napperby.

See also
List of Eucalyptus species

References

Trees of Australia
percostata
Myrtales of Australia
Flora of South Australia
Taxa named by Ian Brooker
Plants described in 1990